The Geneva Academy of International Humanitarian Law and Human Rights is a postgraduate joint center (between the University of Geneva and the Graduate Institute of International and Development Studies) located in Geneva, Switzerland. The faculty includes professors from both founding institutions and guest professors from major universities .

It is located in the Villa Moynier building, built in 1847 and was owned by Gustave Moynier, co-founder of the International Committee of the Red Cross.

History 
Professor Andrew Clapham was the first Director of the Geneva Academy (2006–2014). From August 2014 to August 2018, the Geneva Academy was directed by Professor Robert Roth. In August 2018, Professor Marco Sassòli became the new Director of the Geneva Academy. He has been Professor of International Law at the University of Geneva Law Faculty since 2004 and has been teaching IHL at the Geneva Academy since this time.  Professor Gloria Gaggioli, Associate/SNF Professor at the Law Faculty of the University of Geneva, took over as Director in August 2020.

Master's programmes 
The Geneva Academy offers three master's programmes: 
 LLM in International Humanitarian Law and Human Rights
 Master of Advanced Studies in Transitional Justice, Human Rights and the Rule of Law
 Executive Master in International Law in Armed Conflict

Training and short courses 
The Geneva Academy offers a range of training and short courses for professionals on legal issues related to armed conflicts, human rights protection, transitional justice and international criminal justice.

Research 

The Geneva Academy conducts legal research and policy studies in the fields of international law in armed conflict, human rights protection, transitional justice, international criminal justice, weapons law, or economic, social and cultural rights.

Current research projects include the protection of persons with disabilities during and following armed conflicts, human rights responsibilities and armed non-state actors, human rights and gender equality in the context of business activities, or the rights of peasants.

The Geneva Academy also runs the online platform Rule of Law in Armed Conflicts (RULAC) that systematically qualifies situations of armed violence using the definition of armed conflict under international humanitarian law.

The Geneva Academy is home to the Swiss Chair of International Humanitarian Law, currently held by Professor Robin Geiß, Professor of International Law and Security at the University of Glasgow, Director of the Glasgow Centre for International Law and Security (GCILS) and a former Legal Adviser to the International Committee of the Red Cross, and the Human Rights Chair, currently held by Professor Nils Melzer, UN Special Rapporteur on torture and other cruel, inhuman or degrading treatment or punishment.

Villa Moynier 

The Geneva Academy is headquartered at the Villa Moynier, a historic villa surrounded by a beautiful park with a view of Lake Geneva and Mont Blanc. It was the property of Gustave Moynier, the first President of the ICRC. It later housed the League of Nations in 1926 and served as headquarters for the ICRC between 1933 and 1946. Villa Moynier forms part of the Graduate Institute's Campus de la paix and is near the Maison de la paix.

References

External links 
Official website
 University of Geneva
The Graduate Institute of International and Development Studies, Geneva

Schools in Geneva
Legal education in Switzerland
Humanities education
International criminal law
Graduate Institute of International and Development Studies
University of Geneva
Humanitarian aid organizations
Human rights in Switzerland
Swiss humanitarians
Educational institutions established in 2007
2007 establishments in Switzerland